Ballina may refer to:

Ballina, County Mayo, Ireland
Ballina, County Tipperary, Ireland
Ballina, New South Wales, Australia
Electoral district of Ballina, an electoral district in the New South Wales Legislative Assembly, based in the area
 Ballina Shire, a local government area of which Ballina is the largest town and the administrative centre
 Ballina, a location south of Cazenovia, Madison County, New York, US

See also
 Balina, a surname